Mir Showkat Ali Badsha (মীর শওকাত আলী বাদশা) is a Bangladesh Awami League politician and the incumbent Member of Parliament from Bagerhat-2.

Early life
Badsha was born on 31 December 1946. He has a M.A. and LLB degree.

Career
Badsha was elected to Parliament from Bagerhat-2 in 2014 as a Bangladesh Awami League candidate. He is the chairperson of the Parliamentary Standing Committee on child rights. He is a member of the Treasury Bench. He is a member of the Parliamentary Standing Committee on the Fisheries and Livestock Ministry.

References

Awami League politicians
Living people
1946 births
10th Jatiya Sangsad members
9th Jatiya Sangsad members